R-Point is a 2004 South Korean psychological horror war film written and directed by Kong Su-chang. Set in Vietnam in 1972, during the Vietnam War, it stars Kam Woo-sung and Son Byong-ho as members of the South Korean Army in Vietnam. Most of the movie was shot in Cambodia. Bokor Hill Station plays a prominent part of the movie, in this case doubling as a French colonial plantation. In 2011, Palisades Tartan re-released this film on DVD under the title Ghosts of War.

Plot

On 7 January 1972, the South Korean base in Nha-Trang, Vietnam, receives a radio transmission from a missing platoon that was sent to R-point, a strategic island in the south of Saigon, and has been presumed dead. Lieutenant Choi is ordered to lead a squad of eight soldiers, including Sergeant Jin Chang-rok to assist him, to extract the missing soldiers from Romeo point (R-Point) in one week in exchange for early honorable discharge for the whole squad and clean record of Choi due to his previous insurbodination. Upon arriving, they are ambushed by what they discover to be a Vietnamese woman alongside a week-old corpse.

After their first night, a huge, empty French Plantation suddenly appeared where they set up their base. While checking the area, Corporal Joh Byung-hoon pees and gets left behind by his group. He sees other soldiers and follows them thinking they were from his unit. The other members of the unit search for him and find him hiding in a cave terrified to death. Corporal Joh relays the incident that he saw the missing soldiers but they refuse to believe him. Later that evening, while fixing the radio, Corporal Byun Moon-Sub receives a transmission from a French unit stationed nearby. A French army corporal named Jacques sent a message saying he has a twin brother named Paul who is also in the army. The Lieutenant confirms that they're the only unit in the area. During the night, a group of American soldiers come to inspect the plantation and tells them a story about a group of French garrison who were wiped out by something supernatural before leaving the place but not before warning the Koreans not to touch their stuffs in the second floor. 

Before calling it a night, the soldiers happily dance to the radio that Corporal Byun fixed. Their party is immediately cut short by the voices of terrified screaming men recorded on the radio. On their second day, a soldier reports that their colleague is missing, Private Jung, who is supposed to be on duty from 06:00. While searching, a pool of blood suddenly drenches Sergeant Park. They find Private Jung's corpse hanging from a rope. Upon returning to their base, the unit's radio finally reaches the headquarters and reports what happened. On the radio, Captain Park said that Private Jung was one of the missing soldiers that the unit is supposed to rescue.

Later that night, Lieutenant Choi has visions of a lady in an áo dài which is the same Viet Cong woman who ambushed the platoon. Sergeant Oh then encounters the ghost of his friend. He runs away and accidentally falls for the booby trap that they have set up earlier and dies. On the fourth day, the unit divides into two groups to search the area again. They discovered the downed Huey helicopter and discovered the corpse of the American soldiers they met the previous days but much to their horror the corpses have been decayed for months. A terrified Corporate Joh, mistakenly thinks he sees a ghost and accidentally fires at Sergeant Mah who immediately dies. As they come back to the plantation, they frantically search for the second floor for the American supplies, only to find it empty and the whole second floor is abandoned, indicating that the Americans they saw were ghosts. On the fifth day, realizing that the whole R-point is haunted, they contact headquarters and call for rescue but the earliest a helicopter can arrive will be by dawn the next day. Sergeant Jin seemingly returns and says they should have never come to R-Point. Though he was able to state his name and rank completely at the Lieutenant's request, he suddenly beheads Sergeant Park before being shot dead by the soldiers. Lieutenant Choi then orders everyone to verify their names and ranks. Corporal Byun, appearing to be possessed, is shot by Lieutenant Choi but not before removing the pin of a grenade from his jacket, blinding the youngest soldier, Sergeant Jang Young-soo, who was standing near him.

While the lieutenant helps Sergeant Jang, Corporal Lee Jae-pil laments the situation they're in, to Corporal Joh who also seems possessed and shoots him. The lieutenant kills Corporal Joh; with two of them left, Lieutenant Cho finds a picture of French soldiers with the lady in the áo dài in Sergeant Jang Young-soo's pocket, revealing that the spirit of the woman haunted the entire R-point and she was responsible for the death of the French garrison and the US soldiers. When she appears, Lieutenant Cho asks Sergeant Jang to pick up his rifle. Knowing he may turn out possessed like his colleagues, the lieutenant instructs the Sergeant to point the weapon in his direction and fire. The next morning, Sergeant Jang is found alone by the rescue team, with the corpses of the eight other missing soldiers.

Cast
 Kam Woo-sung as Lt. Choi Tae-in
 Son Byong-ho as Sgt. Jin Chang-rok
 Park Sang-won as Sergeant Cook
 Lee Sun-kyun as Sergeant Park
 Oh Tae-kyung as Sergeant Jang Young-soo
 Son Jin-ho as Sergeant Oh
 Mun Yeong-dong as Corporal Byun Moon-sub
 Jeong Kyeong-ho as Corporal Lee Jae-pil
 Kim Byeong-cheol as Corporal Joh Byung-hoon
 Gi Ju-bong as Captain Park
 Ahn Nae-sang as Captain Kang

Release

Marketing
Before the film was released, the film makers conducted viral marketing to promote the film. The official website, www.rpoint.com, carried several fictional articles such as a journal written by an American war correspondent, statements made by various soldiers who witnessed events portrayed in the film, radio transmissions supposedly received by Korean soldiers, Internet news links about missing Korean soldiers in Vietnam and a fictional timeline of R-Point.

Reception

R-Point receives mixed reviews, with the review aggregation website Rotten Tomatoes offers as "Rotten" a score of 55% from 11 critics, and a rating average of 6.11 out of 10.

Awards and nominations
2004 Blue Dragon Film Awards
 Nomination - Best Supporting Actor - Son Byong-ho
 Nomination - Best New Director - Kong Su-chang

2004 Korean Film Awards
 Nomination - Best Supporting Actor - Son Byong-ho
 Nomination - Best New Director - Kong Su-chang

2005 Grand Bell Awards
 Best Sound - Kang Joo-seok, Lead Sound
 Nomination - Best New Director - Kong Su-chang

See also
 Korean horror

References

External links
 
 
 
 IGN R-Point Review
 R-POINT (2004; DVD Review)

2004 horror films
2000s action horror films
2000s war films
South Korean action horror films
South Korean war films
Vietnam War films
Films set in 1972
Cinema Service films
2000s Korean-language films
2004 films
2000s South Korean films